A volley in tennis is a shot in which the ball is struck before it bounces on the ground. Generally a player hits a volley while standing near the net, although it can be executed farther back, in the middle of the tennis court or even near the baseline. The word derives  from M. French volée meaning flight.

The primary objective of the volley is to go on the offensive and cut the amount of time for the opponent to react. Another advantage is that a player eliminates any possibility of a bad bounce from an uneven surface such as on some grass and clay courts.  Also, if near the net, a volleyer has a wider choice of angles to hit into the opponent's court.  However, quick reflexes and hand–eye coordination are required to execute this shot. The primary means of countering a volley are the passing shot and the lob.

Generally, a player who advances to the net in the serve and volley type of game will make the initial volley fairly near the service line.  The player will then move closer to the net in hopes of making a put-away volley for a winning point.  It is difficult to hit an effective volley in the area between the baseline and the service line, and consequently this is often called "no man's land".

Hitting a volley and variants 

A regular volley is hit with a short backswing and a punching stroke. While standing at the net, a player usually has no time to take a long backswing. When the ball comes at less pace, though, the volleyer can take a longer backswing to impart more force on the ball, which is called a swing volley. A player can also touch the ball lightly, so that the ball will fall just after the net. This is known as a drop volley.

Another type of volley is the drive volley. This is hit with full backswing and follow through. Effectively this is a volley equivalent of a groundstroke and a very aggressive shot, giving your opponent less time, and can be used as a way to approach the net (approach shot).

To be effective and safe, a volley should be either (1)  a drop volley that barely passes the net so the opposing player will not be able to get to it, or (2) a very sharply angled shot so that again the opponent will not be able to get to it, or (3) a hard shot that bounces very near both the opponent's baseline and the sideline and that serves as a set-up shot in anticipation of a weak return by the opponent. Any other volley will permit the opponent to get to the ball in plenty of time to make an aggressive return shot, either a lob or a passing shot.

Half volley 

This tennis shot is called a half volley given that the ball has not been intercepted before it bounced. The racquet contacts the ball almost at surface level. The lower the ball comes at the volleyer, the more difficult this shot becomes as it requires both adaptive thinking and quick reflexes. In such cases, it can be more advantageous to let the ball bounce and immediately hit the return on the rise rather than attempt to volley it. Some notable half volley experts included players such as: John McEnroe, Patrick Rafter, and Leander Paes.

Exceptional volleyers

In his 1979 autobiography, Jack Kramer, devoted a page to the best tennis strokes he had ever seen.  He wrote: 
FOREHAND VOLLEY—Wilmer Allison of Texas, who won the 1935 Forest Hills, had the best I ever saw as a kid, and I've never seen anyone since hit one better.  Budge Patty came closest, then Newcombe.  BACKHAND VOLLEY—Close among Budge, Sedgman and Rosewall, with Sedgman getting the edge probably because of his quickness.  Schroeder and Trabert were almost as outstanding.

Among open era (post 1968) male players, John McEnroe and Stefan Edberg and Leander Paes are generally regarded as being the finest and most natural volleyers, though some consider Patrick Rafter or Tim Henman to have been equally proficient. Pete Sampras is also regarded as having had the finest volleys in recent times.

Among open era female players, Martina Navratilova is considered to be the outstanding volleyer. Jana Novotná was also noted for her superior volleying skills.

Other male players known for their superior volleying skills include:

 Vinnie Richards
 Jack Kramer
 Frank Sedgman
 Lew Hoad
 Rod Laver
 Ken Rosewall
 Tom Okker
 Tony Roche
 John Newcombe
 Ilie Nastase
 John McEnroe
 Pat Cash
 Stefan Edberg
 Boris Becker
 Michael Stich
 Pete Sampras
 Patrick Rafter
 Marcelo Rios
 Leander Paes
 Tim Henman
 Michael Llodra
 Radek Stepanek
 Roger Federer
 Feliciano López

Female players known for their superior volleying skills include:

 Maria Esther Bueno
 Billie Jean King
 Margaret Court
 Evonne Goolagong 
 Martina Navratilova
 Hana Mandlikova
 Jana Novotná
 Gabriela Sabatini
 Kimiko Date
 Martina Hingis
 Amélie Mauresmo
 Justine Henin
 Venus Williams
 Francesca Schiavone
 Agnieszka Radwańska
 Roberta Vinci

References

External links

 Video: Tips for a good volley
 Video: How to volley
 Tennis Training Aids: Tip on Volley

Tennis shots

simple:Tennis#Shots